Petra Pau (born 9 August 1963) is a German politician of The Left. She has been a member of the Bundestag since 1998. Since 2006, she has also served as one of the Vice Presidents of the Bundestag, being the first member of her party to hold this office. Pau belongs to the reform-oriented wing of her party, actively supporting parliamentary representative democracy.

Political career 
Pau's first involvement in politics came in 1983 when she joined the Socialist Unity Party (SED), the governing party of East Germany. She worked as a functionary for the Free German Youth as a leader of the East German pioneers. After German reunification, the SED became the Party of Democratic Socialism (PDS) and she was elected as a PDS member to the Borough Assembly of Hellersdorf in Eastern Berlin in October 1990. She became district chairwoman of the PDS branch in Hellersdorf in October 1991, and was elected chairwoman of the Berlin PDS association in October 1992. From 2000 to 2002, she was deputy chairwoman of the federal party.

She was elected to the state parliament of Berlin in 1995, and remained a member until 1998, when she was elected to the Bundestag for the Berlin Mitte – Prenzlauer Berg constituency. Controversial boundary changes abolished this constituency and for the 2002 election, she contested Berlin-Marzahn-Hellersdorf, regarded as a safe seat for the PDS. She was elected for that constituency and became one of only two members of the Bundestag for her party, which fell below the 5% electoral threshold. When the new Left party regained representation in 2005, Pau was also re-elected in Marzahn-Hellersdorf. She retained the constituency in 2009, 2013, and 2017, but was defeated in 2021 by CDU candidate Mario Czaja. She nonetheless re-entered the Bundestag on the Left party list.

After the 2005 federal election, the Left group offered Lothar Bisky as their candidate for Vice-President of the Bundestag, but he failed to win a majority after four rounds of voting. They subsequently put forward Pau, who was elected on the first ballot. She has been re-elected as Vice-President in each subsequent term. Since the 2013 term, she has been the longest-serving Vice-President.

Speaking of her upbringing, Pau said: "Of course my past is typical for someone who grew up in the GDR. I was a teacher and Pioneer leader in East Berlin. It is my past which drives me today in my commitment to a democratic society, and I reject any suggestion that this is not the case or even possible." In her capacity as Vice-President, she seeks to be impartial but not apolitical, and champions civil rights and democracy.

References

Literature 
Michael F. Feldkamp (ed.), Der Bundestagspräsident. Amt – Funktion – Person. 16. Wahlperiode, München 2007,

External links 

 Petrapau.de

1963 births
Living people
Female members of the Bundestag
Members of the Bundestag for Berlin
21st-century German women politicians
Members of the Bundestag 2021–2025
Members of the Bundestag 2017–2021
Members of the Bundestag 2013–2017
Members of the Bundestag 2009–2013
Members of the Bundestag 2005–2009
Members of the Bundestag 2002–2005
Members of the Bundestag 1998–2002
Members of the Bundestag for The Left
People from Berlin
People from East Berlin
20th-century German women